Tanguy Pastureau (born 26 January 1974 in Pessac) is a French radio and television comedian.

References

External links

French comedians
French male comedians
Living people
1974 births
People from Gironde